Mexico is a country in North America.

Mexico may also refer to:

Geography

Australia
 Mexico, Queensland, a locality in the Barcaldine Region

Mexico
Mexico City (México, D.F.; Ciudad de México; Distrito Federal)
State of Mexico (Estado Libre y Soberano de México; México)

Philippines 
Mexico, Pampanga, a municipality in the Philippines

United States 
State of New Mexico
Mexico, Indiana
Mexico, Kentucky
Mexico, Maine, a New England town
Mexico (CDP), Maine, the main village in the town
Mexico, Allegany County, Maryland
Mexico, Carroll County, Maryland
Mexico, Missouri
Mexico (town), New York
Mexico (village), New York, within the town
Mexico, Ohio
Mexico, Juniata County, Pennsylvania
Mexico, Montour County, Pennsylvania
Mexico, Texas

Music

Albums
Mexico (EP), by Böhse Onkelz
Mexico (GusGus album), 2014
México (Julio Iglesias album), 2015
¡México!, a 2010 album by Rolando Villazón
Mexico, a 2006 album by Jean Leclerc
Mexico EP, a 2011 EP by The Staves
México, México (album), a 2006 compilation album by various artists

Songs
"Mexico" (instrumental), a 1961 hit by Bob Moore
"Mexico" (Butthole Surfers song)
"Mexico" (James Taylor song), later covered by Jimmy Buffett
"Mexico" (Jefferson Airplane song)
"México, México" (song), a song by RBD for the Mexico national football team in the 2006 FIFA World Cup
"Mexico", a song by 12 Rods from the extended play Gay?
"Mexico", a song by Alestorm from their album No Grave But the Sea
"Mexico", a song by Cake from the album Prolonging the Magic
"Mexico", a song by Carrie Underwood from the album Storyteller
"Mexico", a song by Firefall from the album Firefall
"Mexico", a song by Incubus from the album Morning View
"Mexico", a song by Jireel
"Mexico", a song by Katrina and the Waves from Katrina and the Waves 2
"Mexico", a song by Les Humphries Singers
"Mexico", a song by Long John Baldry
"México", a song by Maná from their album Maná
"Mexico", a song by Morrissey from You Are the Quarry
"Mexico", a song by Murcof and Erik Truffaz
"Mexico", a song by Nazareth from their album 2XS
"México", a song by Timbiriche from La Banda Timbiriche

Other
Mexico (barque), a ship wrecked at Southport on 9 December 1886
Mexico (cartoon), a 1930 Walter Lantz cartoon
Mexico (game), a dice game
Mexico (beetle), a genus of beetles
Mexico (novel), a novel by  James A. Michener
Ron Mexico, an alias for NFL player Michael Vick
PS Mexico, a sidewheel paddle steamer, see

See also

Mexican (disambiguation)
Mexico City (disambiguation)
New Mexico (disambiguation)
Moxico (disambiguation)